The , also known as the , occurred in the early Heian period. In 810, Emperor Saga and ex-Emperor Heizei stood in opposition, but Saga's side quickly raised enough troops to resolve the confrontation, making Heizei become a monk. Heizei's lover the  Fujiwara no Kusuko and her older brother the sangi Fujiwara no Nakanari were punished for the incident.

The incident was originally viewed as having been precipitated by Kusuko herself, and thus was called the "Kusuko Incident". In recent years, the view that the incident was caused by the division of power between the emperor of Japan and retired emperor under the Ritsuryō system has taken root. Since 2003, some Japanese high school textbooks have begun to refer to the incident as the "Retired Emperor Heizei Incident".

Background 
When Emperor Kanmu died in 806, his son Crown Prince Ate took the throne as Emperor Heizei. Heizei in turn appointed his younger brother Prince Kamino as crown prince. This decision is thought to have been influenced by Kanmu's opinion, and the fact that Heizei was sickly and his children were still young. Even so, an internal succession dispute in the court could not be avoided. The new emperor's younger brother by another mother, Prince Iyo, was accused the next year of plotting a coup, and ultimately committed suicide.

In 809, Heizei fell ill, and fearing that the sickness was a curse by the vengeful spirits of Prince Sawara and Prince Iyo, chose to abdicate the throne to prevent calamity. The  Fujiwara no Kusuko and her older brother, the sangi Fujiwara no Nakanari, strongly opposed this decision, but the Emperor did not back down, and ten days later his brother Crown Prince Kamino took the throne as Emperor Saga. Saga chose Heizei's third son  as crown prince.

Early the next year, Emperor Heizei moved to the old capital at Heijō-kyō and recovered from his illness. Angered by Saga's attempt to change the  regional inspection system he had established, the retired emperor set up a competing court. Kusuko and Nakanari, plotting Heizei's complete restoration to the throne, encouraged the opposition between the two. At the time, retired emperors were able to involve themselves in politics in the same way as the current sovereign, as ex-Empress Kōken did during the reign of Emperor Junnin, and so Heizei was able to command the Daijō-kan via Kusuko's office.

Within a few months of this situation, Saga established the Kurōdo-dokoro to regain control of the issuance of imperial decrees, and three months later abolished the kansatsu-shi and reinstituted the office sangi. This further incited Heizei's opposition.

Incident 
In the autumn of 810, amid the deepening rivalry between the two courts, Heizei issued an order to abandon Heian-kyō and move the capital back to Heijō-kyō. By sending these trusted attendants to Heizei's base of operations, he may have hoped to check his rival's power. The incident is said to have shaken him greatly.

Finally, Saga decided to veto the relocation of the capital. Four days after Heizei's move, he sent delegates to Ise Province, Ōmi Province, and Mino Province commanding them to tighten their borders. In addition, he captured Fujiwara no Nakanari, placing him under military confinement and demoting him to provisional governor of Sado Province. He also divested Kusuko of her rank and released an imperial edict describing her sins. Meanwhile, he promoted the three officials he had appointed to manage construction: Tamuramaro to dainagon, Fuyutsugu to vice-minister of the Shikibu-shō, and Taue to governor of Owari Province.

The next day, Saga sent secret envoys to Heijō-kyō to call together a few high officials. Fujiwara no Manatsu and Funya no Watamaro returned to Heian-kyō, but Watamaro was deemed to be on Heizei's side and imprisoned.

When Heizei learned of all this he was enraged, and decided to travel east personally to gather an army. Many of his retainers, including the chūnagon Fujiwara no Kadonomaro, warned him strongly against this, but Heizei boarded a palanquin with Kusuko and embarked.

Saga ordered Sakanoue no Tamuramaro to block Heizei's move. As Tamuramaro left, he asked for the release of Watamaro, his former comrade from the subjugation of the Emishi, and Watamaro was pardoned and appointed as sangi. That evening, Nakanari was shot to death. This was a rare application of the death penalty during the Heian period — the next execution was almost 350 years later, when Minamoto no Tameyoshi was executed after the Hōgen Rebellion in 1156.

Heizei and Kusuko made it only as far as Soekami District in Yamato Province before realizing that Emperor Saga's forces had tightened their guard. With no hope of victory, they reluctantly returned to Heijō-kyō. Ex-Emperor Heizei shaved his head and became a monk, and Fujiwara no Kusuko committed suicide by drinking poison.

Aftermath 
After the incident was resolved, Emperor Saga commanded that those involved be treated leniently. Crown Prince Takaoka was disinherited as crown prince, and Saga appointed his own younger brother Prince Ōtomo, the future Emperor Junna, as crown prince in his stead. When Heizei died in 824, Saga, who had by this time himself abdicated, got his successor Junna to pardon the guilty parties.

The monk Kūkai, who had prayed for Emperor Saga's side during the incident, was also able to use this success as an opportunity to elevate himself as the leading Buddhist figure in Japan.

Individuals punished in connection with the incident

References 

9th century in Japan
Buddhism in the Heian period
810
Japanese imperial history